Tulip Fever is a 2017 historical romantic drama film directed by Justin Chadwick and written by Deborah Moggach and Tom Stoppard, adapted from Moggach's 1999 novel of the same name. It stars an ensemble cast featuring Alicia Vikander, Dane DeHaan, Jack O'Connell, Holliday Grainger, Tom Hollander, Matthew Morrison, Kevin McKidd, Douglas Hodge, Joanna Scanlan, Zach Galifianakis, Judi Dench, and Christoph Waltz. The plot follows a 17th-century "Tulip mania" painter in Amsterdam who falls in love with a married woman whose portrait he has been commissioned to paint.

Filmed in the summer of 2014, Tulip Fever was delayed numerous times before finally being released in the United States on 1 September 2017. It received generally unfavourable reviews from critics and grossed $9 million worldwide against its $25 million budget. This was also the last film to be theatrically released by The Weinstein Company, which filed for bankruptcy following a series of sexual assault cases against co-founder Harvey Weinstein.

Plot
The orphan Sophia is cared for in a convent in the Dutch Republic just before the 17th century tulip mania. A marriage proposal from the far-older spice merchant Cornelis enables her to leave, with the generous dowry allowing her sisters to emigrate to New Amsterdam, where they have an aunt awaiting them, their only surviving relative.
 
Three years later, Sophia is unhappy in the marriage, since Cornelis seems to be concerned only with conceiving an heir, to no avail thus far. Cornelis believes this misfortune to have something to do with a mistake he made in the past, with his previous wife: she miscarried their first child and when Cornelis asked the doctor to save the second child over the wife, he feels that God punished him by taking both his wife and his child.
 
Cornelis hires a painter so that he may be remembered as having a beautiful young wife, should he have no heir to continue his legacy. Sophia agrees, but as soon as the young painter Jan arrives to paint the couple, he and Sophia fall in love. Jan sends a note to Sophia, asking her to send him a vase of tulips. She shows up at his door with the tulips, and they consummate their love.
 
Meanwhile, Sophia's friend, the housemaid Maria, is in a courtship with the neighborhood fishmonger, Willem. Willem is speculating in the tulip market, and is doing quite well and, expecting to be independently prosperous and able to marry Maria, he sells his business to another fishmonger. Sophia borrows Maria's cloak and heads to a rendezvous with Jan. Willem, seeing Sophia in the cloak, mistakes her for Maria, and follows her to her rendezvous. Crushed by what he thinks is Maria's infidelity, he goes to a pub to drown his sorrows. There a prostitute robs him of the money he has acquired in the tulip market. When he tries to retrieve the money, he is beaten by her brother and a mob of his friends and forcibly pressed into the Dutch Navy.
 
Jan plots to escape to the new world with Sophia, after having success of his own in the tulip market. He learns that the nuns at St. Ursula (the convent Sophia came from) raise tulips in their gardens. Jan attempts to steal some of the bulbs but is knocked out by the abbess of St. Ursula. When he regains consciousness, he apologizes and the abbess gives him the bulbs Willem had bought before he was abducted into the navy.
 
Maria realizes that she is pregnant with Willem's child. With Willem gone, the baby will be born out of wedlock. Maria explains her condition to Sophia and threatens to reveal Sophia's affair to Cornelis if she disclosed to Cornelis the pregnancy. Sophia conspires with Maria to pass off the pregnancy as her own: when the baby is born, Sophia will pretend to die in childbirth so she can leave with Jan and Maria can raise the child as her own with Cornelis.
 
After Maria gives birth to a daughter and Sophia pretends to die, Cornelis is grief stricken at the loss of his wife. Sophia, under her shroud, weeps as she realizes that she has deeply hurt Cornelis with her deceit, but eventually realizes that it is too late to undo what she has done. Ashamed of herself, Sophia runs away and Jan is unable to find her.
 
Willem, returning after his stint in the navy in Africa, visits Maria at Cornelis's house. Maria is furious at him, but they soon reconcile once he discovers he was not betrayed. Cornelis overhears their loud quarreling and the revelation of the conspiracy among Maria, Sophia, and Jan. Cornelis makes his peace with the truth, and departs for the Dutch East Indies, where he finds love and makes a family, but only after leaving the house to Maria, Willem, and the baby girl that he loved as his own.
 
Eight years later, the abbess of St. Ursula visits Jan and views his artwork of Sophia. She praises him for his talent, and commissions him to paint a mural in the church. When Jan looks down from the scaffold, he sees Sophia, who has joined the convent, and they share tender smiles.

Cast

 Dane DeHaan as Jan van Loos, a painter
 Alicia Vikander as Sophia Sandvoort, orphaned wife to a wealthy merchant
 Christoph Waltz as Cornelis Sandvoort, a wealthy spice merchant
 Jack O'Connell as Willem Brok, a fishmonger
 Holliday Grainger as Maria, the Sandvoorts’ maid
 Judi Dench as the Abbess of St. Ursula
 Zach Galifianakis as Gerrit, assistant to Jan
 Matthew Morrison as Mattheus, a friend and associate of Jan
 Cara Delevingne as Annetje, a tulip trader and petty thief
 Joanna Scanlan as Mrs. Overvalt, a dressmaker
 Tom Hollander as Dr. Sorgh, a physician 
 Cressida Bonas as Mrs. Steen, an old friend of Cornelis and Sophia
 Kevin McKidd as Johan de Bye, a tulip trader 
 David Harewood as Mr. Prater, a representative of St. Ursula’s Convent

Production
The film was originally planned to be made in 2004 on a $48 million budget, with Jude Law, Keira Knightley and Jim Broadbent as lead actors, John Madden as director and Steven Spielberg producing through DreamWorks. However, the production was halted days before it was scheduled to start filming as a result of changes in tax rules affecting film production in the UK.

In 2014, Alison Owen partnered with Weinstein to restart the film after re-acquiring the rights to the film from Paramount Pictures. In October 2013, Dane DeHaan was in talks to join the cast. In February 2014, Christoph Waltz joined the cast. In April 2014, Holliday Grainger, Cara Delevingne, and Jack O'Connell joined the cast. According to Cara Delevingne, the real reason for her casting was that producer Harvey Weinstein sexually harassed her, attempted to kiss her without consent, and propositioned her for a threesome in a hotel room in exchange for a role. Despite declining, she was still cast in the film but says she regretted it as his actions terrified her. In June 2014, Judi Dench was cast as the abbess of St. Ursula, who takes in orphaned children. That same month Tom Hollander, Cressida Bonas, and David Harewood joined the cast. In August 2014, Matthew Morrison joined. Deborah Moggach, author of the novel, also appears in the film. Harvey Weinstein offered Harry Styles the role of Mattheus, but the singer turned it down due to scheduling conflicts, and Matthew Morrison was cast instead.

The crew of Tulip Fever included cinematographer Eigil Bryld, production designer Simon Elliott, costume designer Michael O’Connor, hair and make-up designer Daniel Phillips and editor Rick Russell. Tom Stoppard adapted the screenplay for the film. The London-based Welsh portrait artist Jamie Routley did the original portraits that are seen in the film. Danny Elfman composed the film's score.

Filming took place at Cobham Hall in Gravesend, Kent where production transformed a wing at the school into a 17th-century Amsterdam Gracht. The waterway was also constructed from scratch, complete with barges and donkeys crossing humpback bridges. Additionally, the school's courtyard was used as the brewery yard in the story. Other filming locations include Norwich Cathedral, Holkham (in Norfolk), Tilbury (in Essex), Kentwell Hall (in Suffolk), and at Pinewood Studios on various dates throughout June and July in 2014. Filming also took place in Haddenham, Buckinghamshire.

Release
Footage from the film was screened in May 2015 at the 68th Cannes Film Festival. In December 2015, the first image of the film featuring Alicia Vikander and Christoph Waltz was released. The film was originally scheduled to be released in November 2015, but was pushed back to 15 July 2016 and then delayed again until 24 February 2017. It was then pulled from the schedule, and later moved to 25 August 2017. On 16 August 2017, the film was again delayed, this time being pushed back a week to 1 September. The film premiered on 13 August 2017, at London's Soho House.

Reception

Box office
Tulip Fever grossed $2.4 million in the United States and Canada and $6.7 million in other territories for a total of $9.2 million, against a production budget of $25 million.

In North America, Tulip Fever was projected to gross $1–2 million from 765 theatres in its opening weekend. It ended up debuting to $1.2 million ($1.5 million over the four-day Labor Day weekend) in what was the worst combined holiday weekend since 1998. Despite adding seven theaters in its second weekend, the film dropped 75.4% to $285,300, the 37th biggest such drop in history.

Critical response
On review aggregator Rotten Tomatoes, the film has an approval rating of 10% based on 60 reviews, with an average rating of 4.4/10. The site's critical consensus reads, "Tulip Fever is a lush, handsomely-mounted period piece undone by uninspired dialogue and excessive plotting." On Metacritic, which assigns a normalised average rating to reviews, the film has an average score of 38 out of 100, based on 21 critics, indicating "generally unfavorable reviews".

Writing for Rolling Stone, Peter Travers gave the film 1 star out of 4, saying, "Tulip Fever, which was shot in 2014 but only hitting theatres now after years of re-cutting, retooling and release-date reshuffling, should have been allowed to die on the vine [...] The film just sits there onscreen like a wilting flower with nothing to nourish it."

In December 2018, it was released in several cinemas across the UK. It was reviewed by Adam White of The Daily Telegraph, as "handsome yet cripplingly dull Tulip Fever is every bit a throwback to that age of Chocolat and Captain Corelli’s Mandolin" and it suffers from "clumsy post-production work". It was also the penultimate film to be produced by The Weinstein Company, prior to its closure on 16 July 2018.

Notes and references

Notes

References

External links
 
 

2017 films
2017 romantic drama films
American romantic drama films
American independent films
British romantic drama films
British independent films
Films based on British novels
Films about plants
Films set in the 17th century
Films set in the Dutch Golden Age
Films set in the Netherlands
Films shot at Pinewood Studios
British historical romance films
American historical romance films
Films scored by Danny Elfman
Films produced by Alison Owen
Films with screenplays by Tom Stoppard
Paramount Pictures films
Worldview Entertainment films
Films directed by Justin Chadwick
2010s English-language films
2010s American films
2010s British films